The four horns ( ’ar-ba‘ qərānōṯ) and four craftsmen ( ’arbā‘āh ḥārāšîm, also translated "engravers" or "artisans") are a vision found in Book of Zechariah, in Zechariah 1:21 in traditional English texts. In Hebrew texts 1:18-21 is numbered 2:1-4. The vision precedes the vision of A Man With a Measuring Line.

Hebrew Bible text

In the Talmud
The four craftsmen are discussed in Babylonian Talmud Suk. 52b. Rav Hana bar Bizna attributed to Rav Simeon Hasida the identification of these four craftsmen as Messiah ben David, Messiah ben Joseph, Elijah, and the Righteous Priest. However David Kimhi interpreted the four craftsmen as four kingdoms.

In later interpretation

The imagery of craftsmen is generally considered as "smiths", able to master the four iron horns, as symbolizing nations used as instruments of divine power for the destruction of Israel's enemies.

References

Book of Zechariah